Tulasi (or Tulasi Shivamani) (born 20 June 1967) is an Indian actress who primarily works in Telugu, Kannada, and Tamil cinema. She started her career as a child actress. Later she appeared in lead actress and supporting actress roles. She has acted in over 300 films in Telugu, Kannada, Tamil, Malayalam, and Bhojpuri languages. She won two Nandi Awards and one Filmfare Award.

Career
Tulasi made her debut in the Telugu language when she was three months old in 1967. For a song in a film, a baby was needed and Tulasi was placed in the cradle after actress Savitri had requested Tulasi's mother, who was a friend of her. She was featured in a song when she was three-and-half years old in Jeevanatarangalu and said that she became a full-fledged actor when she was four. She had never been to school.

She got married at age 28 to Kannada director Sivamani. She stated, "I met him in the morning and by evening we tied the knot". They have one son, Sai Tarun. Tulasi decided to quit acting after getting married, working only occasionally as a voice actor in Telugu films, including ones by Mani Ratnam. When her son was around six years old, she received several mother character roles. She initially declined them all, but finally signed on one Kannada film, Excuse Me, in which she played mother to Divya Spandana and which became a big hit. After that she was doing three films a year in Kannada.

She began to act mainly in mother roles in Telugu and Tamil film industries. Her notable supporting roles include performances in Sasirekha Parinayam, Mr. Perfect, Darling, Srimanthudu, Iddarammayilatho, Nenu Local, Mahanati & Dear Comrade in Telugu and Pillaiyar Theru Kadaisi Veedu, Easan, Mankatha, Sundarapandian, Aadhalal Kadhal Seiveer and Pandiya Naadu in Tamil. Tulasi has said that Aadhalal Kadhal Seiveer, in which she had played mother to Manisha Yadav's character, changed her life and brought her an "identity as a screen mother". Her portrayal of Chellamma in Pannaiyarum Padminiyum was praised too, with critics stating that she was "brilliant", and had given her "career best performance".

Partial filmography

Awards
Nandi Awards
Best Child Actress - Seetamalakshmi (1978)
Best Child Actress - Sankarabharanam (1980)

Filmfare Awards South
Filmfare Award for Best Supporting Actress - Kannada - Josh

References

External links
 
 
 Interview with Tulasi

Living people
Indian film actresses
Actresses in Tamil cinema
Actresses in Malayalam cinema
Actresses in Telugu cinema
Actresses in Kannada cinema
Filmfare Awards South winners
1967 births
Child actresses in Telugu cinema
20th-century Indian actresses
21st-century Indian actresses